Dalberto Luan Belo (born 15 September 1994), simply known as Dalberto, is a Brazilian professional footballer who plays as a forward for.

Club career
Born in Bento Fernandes, Rio Grande do Norte, Dalberto started his career with América de Natal in 2013, after being approved on a trial. In early 2014, however, he was released after playing just one match for the first team, and subsequently represented Bonsucesso and São João da Barra.

Ahead of the 2016 season, after nearly one year of inactivity, Dalberto joined Alecrim after a trial period. On 11 May of that year, he moved to ABC, and helped the club in their promotion to the Série B.

In December 2017, after being ABC's top goalscorer in the second division, Dalberto agreed to a deal with Mirassol. He subsequently served loan stints at Londrina and Sampaio Corrêa, being rarely used in both stints; he then returned to Mirassol in for the 2016 Copa Paulista, but still rescinded his contract at the end of the year.

On 20 December 2018, Dalberto was presented at Juventude. He helped the club in their promotion to division two, and moved to Série A side Chapecoense on loan the following 26 September.

Dalberto made his top tier debut on 29 September 2019, starting in a 1–1 away draw against Athletico Paranaense but being replaced with only 11 minutes due to an injury.

Honours
ABC
Campeonato Potiguar: 2017

References

External links
 
 

1994 births
Living people
Sportspeople from Rio Grande do Norte
Brazilian footballers
Association football forwards
Campeonato Brasileiro Série A players
Campeonato Brasileiro Série B players
Campeonato Brasileiro Série C players
América Futebol Clube (RN) players
Bonsucesso Futebol Clube players
Esporte Clube São João da Barra players
Alecrim Futebol Clube players
ABC Futebol Clube players
Mirassol Futebol Clube players
Londrina Esporte Clube players
Sampaio Corrêa Futebol Clube players
Esporte Clube Juventude players
Associação Chapecoense de Futebol players
Sport Club do Recife players
Coritiba Foot Ball Club players
Centro Sportivo Alagoano players